Marseille is a French film directed by Kad Merad, released in 2016.

Plot
Paolo, who left Marseille for Canada after a tragedy, has to return 25 years later when his brother, Joseph, tell him that their father had an accident. Determined to make a brief return, Paolo will realize that the city of Marseille is not the one that he believes ...

Cast
 Kad Merad as Paolo
 Patrick Bosso as Joseph
 Venantino Venantini as Giovanni 
 Judith El Zein as Elena
 Anne Charrier as Valérie
 Louis-Do de Lencquesaing as Stéphane
 Julien Boisselier as Pierre
 Philippe Lefebvre as The CTC Director
 Mathieu Madénian as The butler
 Basile Boli  as himself

References

External links
 

2016 comedy films
2016 films
French comedy films
2010s French-language films
Films directed by Kad Merad
2010s French films